is a Japanese speed skater. She competed at the 1998, 2002 and the 2006 Winter Olympics.

References

External links

1975 births
Living people
Japanese female speed skaters
Olympic speed skaters of Japan
Speed skaters at the 1998 Winter Olympics
Speed skaters at the 2002 Winter Olympics
Speed skaters at the 2006 Winter Olympics
Sportspeople from Hokkaido
Speed skaters at the 2003 Asian Winter Games
20th-century Japanese women
21st-century Japanese women